Colin Dunford (born 15 September 1994) is an Irish hurler who plays for Waterford Intermediate Championship club Colligan and at inter-county level with the Waterford senior hurling team. He usually lines out as a right corner-forward.

Career statistics

Honours

Waterford
National Hurling League (1): 2015

References

1994 births
Living people
Waterford inter-county hurlers
Colligan-Emmets hurlers